M-173 was the designation given to two former state trunklines in the U.S. state of Michigan:

M-173 (1930s Michigan highway) near Orleans in Ionia County
M-173 (1939–1972 Michigan highway) in Menominee

173